The 2022–23 Sport Lisboa e Benfica "B" season is the team's 18th season in existence and their 10th consecutive one in the second division of Portuguese football. The season covers the period from 1 July 2022 to 30 June 2023.

Players

Current squad

Out on loan

Transfers

Pre-season and friendlies

Competitions

Overall record

Liga Portugal 2

League table

Results summary

Results by round

Matches 
The league fixtures were announced on 5 July 2022.

References 

S.L. Benfica B
Benfica B